20th Field Artillery Regiment can refer to:
20th Field Artillery Regiment (Canada)
20th Field Artillery Regiment (United States)